The 2014–15 Women's FIH Hockey World League Final was the 2nd edition of the Finals of the FIH Hockey World League for women. It took place between 5–13 December 2015 in Rosario,  Argentina. A total of eight teams competed for the title.

Argentina won the tournament for the first time after defeating New Zealand 5–1 in the final. Germany won the third place match by defeating China 6–2.

Qualification
The host nation qualified automatically in addition to 7 teams qualified from the Semifinals. The following eight teams, shown with final pre-tournament rankings, competed in this round of the tournament.

Umpires
Below are the 10 umpires appointed by the International Hockey Federation:

Frances Block (GBR)
Maggie Giddens (USA)
Soledad Iparraguirre (ARG)
Michelle Joubert (RSA)
Ayanna McClean (TRI)
Michelle Meister (GER)
Miao Lin (CHN)
Irene Presenqui (ARG)
Aleesha Unka (NZL)
Emi Yamada (JPN)

Results
All times are Argentina Time (UTC−03:00)

First round

Pool A

Matches were scheduled to be played on 8 December but were postponed due to heavy rain.

Pool B

Second round

Quarterfinals

Fifth to eighth place classification
The losing quarterfinalists are ranked according to their first round results to determine the fixtures for the fifth to eighth place classification matches.

Seventh place game

Fifth place game

First to fourth place classification

Semifinals

Third place game

Final

Awards

Statistics

Final standings

Goalscorers

References

External links
Official website

!
Hockey
International women's field hockey competitions hosted by Argentina
Sport in Rosario, Santa Fe